Maria Ruzafa Lozano (born 7 August 1998) is an Andorran footballer who plays as a forward for Italian club Spezia Calcio and the Andorra women's national team.

Club career
Ruzafa has played for ENFAF in Andorra,  for Águilas in Spain and for Ternana in Italy.

International career
Ruzafa has been capped for the Andorra national team, appearing for the team during the 2019 FIFA Women's World Cup qualifying cycle.

International goals

See also
List of Andorra women's international footballers

References

External links
 
 

1998 births
Living people
Andorran women's footballers
Women's association football forwards
Ternana Calcio players
Andorra women's international footballers
Andorran expatriate footballers
Andorran expatriate sportspeople in Spain
Expatriate women's footballers in Spain
Andorran expatriate sportspeople in Italy
Expatriate women's footballers in Italy